Tongoa Airport  is an airport in serving the Tongoa island, located in the Shefa Province of Vanuatu.

Airlines and destinations

References 

Airports in Vanuatu
Shefa Province